Idolothrips is a genus of thrips in the family Phlaeothripidae.

Species
 Idolothrips dissimilis
 Idolothrips spectrum
 Idolothrips yashiroi

References

Phlaeothripidae
Thrips
Thrips genera